Anthony P. Gawronski (March 24, 1900 – January 1972) was an American lawyer and Democratic politician from West Allis, Wisconsin. Gawronski was elected to the Wisconsin State Senate from the 7th District in 1938 and was re-elected in 1942.

Political record 
Gawronski was the Democratic nominee for the 19th Milwaukee County State Assembly seat in 1930. He came in a weak third in a four-way race, trailing Republican Allen Busby and Socialist Robert Buech. In 1932, he was elected as a delegate to the Democratic National Convention from Wisconsin's 4th congressional district, pledged to nominate Franklin D. Roosevelt for President; and served as a Roosevelt presidential elector that fall.

He was first elected to the Senate in 1938, polling 12,032 votes to 10,348 for Socialist Frank Metcalfe (running on the Progressive ticket as part of an electoral fusion arrangement) and 9,175 for a Republican named O'Brien.

He was a delegate to the Democratic National Convention in 1940 and an alternate in 1948.

References

Democratic Party Wisconsin state senators
1900 births
1972 deaths
20th-century American politicians